Reiss James Greenidge (born 8 February 1996) is a professional footballer who plays as a defender for  club Maidstone United. Born in England, he represents the Guyana national team. His brother, Jordan, is also a professional footballer.

He spent time at Arsenal and West Bromwich Albion and had unsuccessful loan spells at Port Vale and Ipswich Town, before joining Ebbsfleet United in January 2016. From there he was loaned out to Hemel Hempstead Town. He travelled to Norway in July 2017 to sign for Sogndal and played first and second tier football for the club, before joining third tier side Arendal in January 2019. He returned to England to sign for Bolton Wanderers in August 2020, who went on to win promotion out of League Two at the end of the 2020–21 season. He was loaned out to Barnet for the 2021–22 season. In October 2022, he signed for Maidstone United.

Career

Early career
Greenidge spent time at Arsenal's Academy, before joining West Bromwich Albion in 2013. In a later interview he said "I learned how to play football at West Brom". He joined Port Vale on loan in September 2014, with the loan expiring on 31 December 2014. He also spent time on loan at Ipswich Town, though only played for the under-21 team. He was never in a first-team matchday squad at West Brom, Port Vale, or Ipswich.

Following his release from West Brom, Greenidge went on trial with Watford, AFC Wimbledon and Crystal Palace before signing with Ebbsfleet United in January 2016. He made his competitive debut for the "Fleet" on 16 February, in a 1–1 draw at Oxford City, coming on as a 81st-minute substitute for Aaron McLean. Three days later he joined National League South rivals Hemel Hempstead Town on a one-month loan deal. He scored his first senior goal on 4 October 2016, in a 2–1 victory over Sheppey United at Stonebridge Road. He asked Ebbsfleet manager Daryl McMahon not to send him out on loan for the 2016–17 season after an impressive pre-season. However he rejoined Hemel Hempstead Town on an initial two-month loan deal on 9 November 2016. On 6 February 2017, he returned to Hemel Hempstead for a third loan spell. He was released by Ebbfleet on 5 June 2017.

Norway
In July 2017, Greenidge signed for Norwegian Eliteserien club Sogndal, having had trials at Viking FK and IK Start. He played ten league games in the 2017 season and also featured twice in the relegation play-offs as Sogndal were relegated after losing a penalty shoot-out to Ranheim. He played nine games in the 2018 campaign. On 30 January 2019, Greenidge joined 2. divisjon side Arendal on a two-year deal. He scored one goal in 19 games in the 2019 season.

Bolton Wanderers
On 4 August 2020, Greenidge signed for English League Two side Bolton Wanderers on a two-year deal. He made his debut for the "Trotters" at the University of Bolton Stadium on 12 September, in a 1–0 defeat by Forest Green Rovers in Bolton's first league match of the 2020–21 season. He played seven games as Bolton secured promotion in third-place, though did not feature after being sent off in a 1–0 defeat to Crawley Town at the University of Bolton Stadium on 2 January. On 3 May 2022, the club confirmed that he would be released at the end of his contract.

Barnet (loan)
On 21 July 2021, Greenidge joined National League side Barnet on a season-long loan deal which the "Bees" reported to be "with a view to a permanent move". He made 28 appearances for the "Bees" in the 2021–22 season, scoring two goals.

Maidstone United
On 21 October 2022, Greenidge signed for National League side Maidstone United.

International career
Greenidge was called up to the Guyana national football team in March 2019. Two years later he was called up for Guyana's qualifiers for the 2021 CONCACAF Gold Cup. His debut came on 3 July 2021 where he started and scored an own goal in a 4–0 defeat against Guatemala, which eliminated Guyana from Gold Cup qualification.

Style of play
Greenidge is a pacey  defender.

Personal life
He was reported to be the grandson of Barbados cricketer Sir Gordon Greenidge, though this was later reported to be untrue.

His brother, Jordan, also plays non-League football.

Career statistics

International

Honours
Bolton Wanderers
EFL League Two third-place promotion: 2020–21

References

1995 births
Living people
Guyanese footballers
Guyana international footballers
English footballers
English people of Guyanese descent
Black British sportspeople
Association football defenders
Arsenal F.C. players
West Bromwich Albion F.C. players
Port Vale F.C. players
Ipswich Town F.C. players
Ebbsfleet United F.C. players
Hemel Hempstead Town F.C. players
Sogndal Fotball players
Bolton Wanderers F.C. players
Barnet F.C. players
Maidstone United F.C. players
National League (English football) players
Eliteserien players
Norwegian First Division players
Norwegian Second Division players
English expatriate footballers
Expatriate footballers in Norway
English expatriate sportspeople in Norway
Guyanese expatriate footballers
Guyanese expatriates in Norway